Edward Joseph "Ed" Doherty, (born May 22, 1949) is a New Brunswick ophthalmologist and politician, who has served in the Legislative Assembly of New Brunswick representing the riding of Saint John Harbour.

He was born in Moncton, New Brunswick, the son of Joseph Doherty and Marion McMackin, and was educated in Moncton, at St. Francis Xavier University and at Dalhousie University. Doherty interned at the Jewish General Hospital in Montreal and practised in Antigonish, Nova Scotia from 1975 to 1980. After continuing his medical studies at Dalhousie University, he set up practice in Saint John in 1984, retiring in 2006. Doherty also lectured in the Department of Ophthalmology at Dalhousie University, was a visiting ophthalmologist on the island of Dominica and, from 1994 to 2003, served as consulting eye physician for the Saint John Flames.

A Liberal, he was elected in a by-election on November 14, 2005, in a race for a seat previously held by the New Democratic Party and in which the Progressive Conservative Party's candidate was thought to be the frontrunner. Doherty's victory, by a margin of 55-26-18 over the PC and NDP candidates, respectively.

The Liberals were successful in gaining power in 2006 and Doherty was re-elected to his seat and joined the cabinet thereafter. He was defeated in the 2010 election by Carl Killen of the Progressive Conservatives, but defeated Killen to reclaim the seat in the 2014 election.

References

External links 
 

1949 births
Canadian ophthalmologists
Living people
Members of the Executive Council of New Brunswick
New Brunswick Liberal Association MLAs
People from Moncton
Canadian politicians with disabilities
21st-century Canadian politicians